The Allenby formation is a sedimentary rock formation in British Columbia which was deposited during the Ypresian stage of the Early Eocene. It consists of conglomerates, sandstones with interbedded shales and coal.  The shales contain an abundance of insect, fish and plant fossils known from 1877 and onward, while the Princeton Chert was first indented in the 1950's and is known from anatomically preserved plants.

There are several notable fossil producing localities in the Princeton & Tulameen basins.  Historical collection sites included Nine Mile Creek, Vermilian Bluffs, and Whipsaw Creek, while modern sites include One Mile Creek, Pleasant Valley, Thomas Ranch, and the Princeton Chert.

Extent and correlation
The grabens extensional faults at the eastern side of the basin place the hanging wall Allenby strata in contact with much older foot wall strata of the Nicola Formation which dates to the Upper Triassic.

The Allenby Formation is the southern-most of the Eocene Okanagan Highlands lakes in British Columbia, and second most southern site after the Klondike Mountain Formation of Republic, Washington and northern Ferry County. In British Columbia, the formation is coeval to the Tranquille Formation, known from the McAbee Fossil Beds and Falkland site, the Coldwater Beds, known from the Quilchena site, and Driftwood Canyon Provincial Park.  The highlands, including the Allenby Formation, have been described as one of the "Great Canadian Lagerstätten" based on the diversity, quality and unique nature of the biotas that are preserved.  The highlands temperate biome preserved across a large transect of lakes recorded many of the earliest appearances of modern genera, while also documenting the last stands of ancient lines.

The warm temperate uplands floras of the Allenby Formation and the highlands, associated with downfaulted lacustrine basins and active volcanism are noted to have no exact modern equivalents, due to the more seasonally equitable conditions of the Early Eocene.  However, the formation has been compared to the upland ecological islands in the Virunga Mountains within the Albertine Rift of the African rift valley.

The earliest work in the region was on exploratory expeditions in 1877 and 1878, with fossils collected in the areas of Nine-Mile Creek, Vermilian Bluffs on the Similkameen River, and Whipsaw Creek. While reporting on additional plant fossils collected from British Columbia, Penhallow (1906) noted the likely coeval status of the Princeton basins with many of the sites now considered the Okanagan Highlands. Modern collecting has centered on the areas around One Mile Creek, Pleasant Valley, and Thomas Ranch.

Age
The age estimates for the Allenby Formation have varied a number of times since the first explorations happened in the 1870s. Shaw (1952) dated the formation as Oligocene, an age followed by Arnold (1955).

Lithology
The Allenby is composed of cyclical sedimentation events that were deposited along the course of a river-system in conjunction with depositional areas from nearby lakes and wetlands.  Coeval volcanic eruptive events are recorded as interbeds of tephras and lavas, while the riverine course is marked with depositional areas of conglomerates and sandstones.  The quieter environments are noted for finer layers of shales and coalified layers.

The coal seams throughout the formation are typically sub-bituminous.

Notable in conjunction with the coal seams are sections of chert which formed during silica rich periods. The rapid cyclical changes from coal to chert and back are not noted in any other fossil locality in the world. An estimated 49 coal-chert cycles are known, though the exact conditions for this process are not well understood. Silica rich volcanic episodes in the region during deposition would have been needed for formation of the cherts, while slowly moving waters and gently subsiding terrains would be needed for the peats and fens to accumulate.

Palynoflora
Palynological analysis of samples from the Thomas ranch site by Dillhoff et al (2013) resulted in the identification of 32 pollen and spore types that were assignable to family or genus level, with a total number of distinct pollen and spore types, including unassignable morphotypes, number over 70.  The predominant pollens of the site are conifers, which make up between 85%–97% of the total pollens, while the angiosperm pollens are dominated by members of Betulaceae.

Several pteridophyte families and genera are represented as spore fossils alone, without corresponding megafossil records, including Lycopodiaceae, Osmundaceae, and Schizaeaceae. Similarly, at least three additional conifer genera are only present as pollen fossils and up to 12 angiosperms are present in the pollen record.  Sometimes considered a Biostratgraphic index fossil, the angiosperm palynospecies Pistillipollenites macgregorii has been recovered from several sites in the Allenby Formation, while the palynospecies Erdtmanipollis pachysandroides is rare, having only been reported from the formation twice.

Compression paleobiota
A group of six mosses were described from the Allenby Formation by Kuc (1972, 1974) representing the genera Ditrichites, Hypnites and Plagiopodopsis, with two species placed in the morphogenus Muscites.  Dillhoff et al (2013) identified twelve distinct gymnosperm taxa spanning the families Cupressaceae, Ginkgoaceae, and Pinaceae. While being the minority component of the Thomas Ranch flora by total fossil numbers, angiosperms have a higher diversity, with 45 distinct morphotypes represented as foliage, reproductive structures, or both.  Seventeen of the morphotypes are identifiable to genus or species, with members of the family Betulaceae being most prominent.  At least common one leaf type is suggested to possibly represent an extinct plant order, but has not been described.  Only two pteridophyte species have been described from the compression flora, Azolla primaeva by Penhallow (1890) and Equisetum similkamense by Dawson (1878).

The following fossil conifers, pteridophytes, ginkgophytes and bryophytes have been described from the Allenby Formation:

Bryophytes

Pteridophytes

Gingkophytes

Pinophytes

Angiosperms

Insects

Coleopterans

Dipterans

Hemipterans

Hymenopterans
Archibald, Mathewes, & Aase (2023) reported a Titanomyrma species ant queen from the Vermillion Bluffs site, and noted the range extension for Formiciinae into the highlands, as the subfamily was previously considered a strictly thermophilic ant group. Due to complications arising from preservational distortion during diagenesis, they were unable to determine the correct size of the queen in life. Conversely stretching the fossil to bilateral symmetry results in a larger  length estimate, placing it as comparable to queens of T. lubei and T. simillima.

Mecopterans

Neuropterans

Odonata

Raphidiopterans

Vertebrates

Princeton Chert biota

The Princeton chert biota is unique in the Allenby formation due to the silicification of the chert, which has resulted in cellular and anatomical preservation of the organisms. As of 2016 over 30 different plant taxa had been described from chert fossils along with a number of fungal species.

Fungi

Ferns

Conifers

Angiosperms

References 

 
Sandstone formations of Canada
Shale formations
Coal formations
Coal in Canada
Lacustrine deposits